The 1987 Polish Speedway season was the 1987 season of motorcycle speedway in Poland.

Individual

Polish Individual Speedway Championship
The 1987 Individual Speedway Polish Championship final was held over 2 days on 29 and 30 August at Toruń.

Golden Helmet
The 1987 Golden Golden Helmet organised by the Polish Motor Union (PZM) was the 1987 event for the league's leading riders. The final was held over four rounds.

Junior Championship
 winner - Piotr Świst

Silver Helmet
 winner - Ryszard Dołomisiewicz

Bronze Helmet
 winner - Piotr Świst

Pairs

Polish Pairs Speedway Championship
The 1987 Polish Pairs Speedway Championship was the 1987 edition of the Polish Pairs Speedway Championship. The final was held on 7 May at Ostrów Wielkopolski.

Team

Team Speedway Polish Championship
The 1987 Team Speedway Polish Championship was the 1987 edition of the Team Polish Championship. 

Unia Leszno won the gold medal. The team included Roman Jankowski, Zenon Kasprzak, Mariusz Okoniewski and Jan Krzystyniak.

First League

Second League

References

Poland Individual
Poland Team
Speedway
1987 in Polish speedway